The 1994 Qatar Open, known as the 1994 Qatar Mobil Open for sponsorship reasons, was an ATP men's tennis tournament held in Doha, Qatar. It was the second edition of the tournament and was held from 3 January until 10 January 1994. Third-seeded Stefan Edberg won his first title of the year and the 39th of his career.

Finals

Singles

 Stefan Edberg defeated  Paul Haarhuis, 6–3, 6–2

Doubles

 Olivier Delaître /  Stéphane Simian defeated  Shelby Cannon /  Byron Talbot, 6–3, 6–3

References